Leandro "Leo" Isaac (born February 2, 1961) is a Filipino former basketball player, commentator and former head coach of the Blackwater Elite in the Philippine Basketball Association.

College career

He played for the Mapua Cardinals in the NCAA from 1978 to 1981 and was voted MVP for the 1981 NCAA Men's Basketball Championship. His notable teammates include Joel Banal, Junel Baculi, and Bong Ramos.

PBA career

He played for Ginebra San Miguel from 1986 to 1991 and 1994 to 1995. In his rookie season in 1986, he helped Ginebra win its first ever championship during the 1986 PBA Open Conference. He earned his spot in coach Robert Jaworski's rotation as a reliable backcourt defender and his valuable contributions on defense helped the Gin Kings win two more championships in 1988 and 1991.

Prior to the start of 1992 PBA season, he was traded to Pepsi for Tonichi Yturri, and then to Shell Rimula-X in exchange for Gido Babilonia and Leo Austria. He helped the Oilers win the 1992 First Conference championship against the San Miguel Beermen. He stayed with the team until the 1993 season.

He retired from playing in the PBA after the 1995 season.

Coaching career

Philippine Basketball League
He once mentored teams such as Dr. J. Alcohol / Ana Water Dispenser, Boom Laundry Masters, Montaña Jewels, Blu All Purpose Detergent Kings, and Noosa Shoe Stars. In 1998, while coaching for Doctor J, he won his first ever championship as a coach at the expense of the heavily favored Tanduay team in the 1998–99 2nd PBL Centennial Cup.

Mapua Cardinals
Isaac took over as Mapua's head coach prior to the 2007 season. He led the Cardinals to back-to-back Final 4 slots wherein during both appearances they were at #4. His records with them were 6–6 and 9–5, respectively.

Barako Bull Energy Boosters
In 2009, Isaac was hired as head coach for the Barako Bull Energy Boosters in the PBA after Yeng Guiao resigned and later moved to Burger King Whoppers. His chief lieutenants were Raymund Celis and Ariel Vanguardia. He was then succeeded by Junel Baculi after coaching just one season.

Arellano University
He led them to several titles including the NCRAA championship in 2007.  After a season coaching Red Bull, in 2010 he once again coached the Chiefs, this time, in the NCAA for two seasons.

Blackwater Elite (PBA D-League)
In 2011, Isaac was appointed head coach of the Blackwater Elite, one of the founding franchises in the newly formed PBA Developmental League. He helped the Elite win its first and only championship against the NLEX Road Warriors during the 2013 PBA D-League Foundation Cup and in the process, earned the distinction as the only team who beat the Road Warriors in the Finals.

Blackwater Elite (PBA)
In 2014, Isaac was retained as the team's head coach after team owner Dioceldo Sy elevated his franchise as an expansion team in the PBA. He is expected to inject the "never-say-die" experience that he got from his playing years with Ginebra. However, his team was winless in the Philippine Cup, with 0–11 win–loss record. In his first season with the Elite, he compiled a 6–27 win–loss record.

Coaching record

Collegiate record

Professional record

Trivia
 He was also a PBA commentator during the 2003 season.
 Outside of basketball, he is also an avid analyst of horse racing.

References

1961 births
Filipino men's basketball coaches
Filipino men's basketball players
Living people
Barangay Ginebra San Miguel players
Mapúa Cardinals basketball players
Barako Bull Energy Boosters coaches
Shell Turbo Chargers players
Great Taste Coffee Makers draft picks
Blackwater Bossing coaches
Arellano Chiefs basketball coaches
Mapúa Cardinals basketball coaches